Ehyophsta (Cheyenne for "Yellow-Haired Woman") was a Cheyenne woman.  She was the daughter of Stands-in-the-Timber who died in 1849, and she was the niece of Bad Faced Bull.  She fought in the Battle of Beecher Island in 1868, and also fought the Shoshone that same year, where she counted coup against one enemy and killed another.  She fought the Shoshone again in 1869. She was also a member of a secret society composed exclusively of Cheyenne women.  She died in 1915.

She is one of the women in the Heritage Floor of the famous feminist installation art work, The Dinner Party, by Judy Chicago.

References 

 Salmonson, Jessica Amanda (1991). The Encyclopedia of Amazons. Paragon House. Page 78. 
 

Year of birth unknown
1915 deaths
Cheyenne people
Native American women in warfare
Women in 19th-century warfare
19th-century Native American women
20th-century Native American women
20th-century Native Americans